Linyi County is a county in the southwest of Shanxi province, China, bordering Shaanxi province to the west. It is under the administration of Yuncheng city.

Climate

Transport 
Linyi is situated about 22 km from Yuncheng city. It has a regular bus service connecting Yuncheng city and Yuncheng North station. The G209 road connects Linyi and Yuncheng.

Education 
There are several key schools in Linyi county which serve the county and surrounding towns and villages. Yuncheng University is 12 km away from Linyi county.

References

External links
www.xzqh.org 

 
County-level divisions of Shanxi